Barbara Frances Ackah-Yensu is a Ghanaian jurist. She is an active Justice of the Supreme Court of Ghana.

Early life and education 
Ackah-Yensu was born on 2 February 1955 in Cape Coast. She had her middle school education at Christ the King School from 1965 to 1967 after which she entered Wesley Girls' High School for her Ordinary Level and Advanced Level Certificates, both of which she obtained in 1972 and 1974 respectively. In 1974, she was admitted to the University of Ghana, where she studied Psychology and Sociology. She obtained her bachelor's degree in Psychology and Sociology in 1977. Following her graduation, she returned to the University of Ghana (Faculty of Law) where she studied for her Qualifying Certificate in Law (QCL) from January 1979 to September 1979. She then proceeded to the Ghana School of Law, where she was called to the Bar in 1981. In 2010, she received an Executive Master's degree from the China Europe International Business School, and in 2019, a diploma in International Arbitration from The Queen's College, Oxford.

Career 
Following her undergraduate studies, Ackah-Yensu joined the Ghana Reassurance Organisation in Accra as a Marketing Officer for her National Service from 1977 to 1979. Following her call to the bar in 1981, she entered private practice working with companies such as Lynes Quarshie-Idun & Co., National Investment Bank (NIB), Non-Performing Assets Recovery Trust, Ghanaian Australian Goldfields Ltd, Ashanti Goldfields Ltd, and World Bank/Non-Performing Assets Recovery Trust in Uganda.

On Tuesday 16 September 2003, Ackah-Yensu was sworn into office as a Justice of the High Court of Ghana. She was based at the Tema High Court until 2005 when she was transferred to the Commercial Court. She continued to serve in that capacity until October 2012 when she was appointed Justice of the Appeals Court of Ghana.

Supreme Court appointment 
On 4 July 2022, the president, based on the advice of the Judicial Council and in consultation with the Council of State, nominated Ackah-Yensu, along with three other judges (George Kingsley Koomson, Samuel Kwame Adibu Asiedu, and Ernest Yao Gaewu) for the Supreme Court. On 25 July 2022, the speaker of parliament, Alban Bagbin, announced the nominations in parliament and referred them to the appointments committee for consideration.

On 18 October 2022, Ackah-Yensu was vetted by the appointments committee, and on 7 December 2022, the appointments committee recommended her approval, along with that of Samuel Adibu Asiedu to parliament. According to the committee, "the two nominees demonstrated dexterity in the knowledge of the law and showed character and competence." They also added that "they pledged to interpret the law without fear or favour and eschew partisanship in their rulings." On 11 December 2022, the Parliament of Ghana unanimously approved her nomination. According to the speaker of parliament, the two nominated judges should have been on the Supreme Court long, long ago. He also added that "she has been an excellent judge; she was an excellent student and throughout she had distinguished herself as a very deep learned professional lawyer. I don’t know why it took that length of time for her to get to the Supreme Court." following her unanimous approval by parliament. 

She was sworn into office by the president, Nana Akuffo-Addo, on Wednesday 28 December 2022.

Personal life 
Ackah-Yensu is married with five children, four sons and a daughter. She is a Christian and a member of the Roman Catholic Church. She enjoys cooking, listening to music, dancing, travelling and reading.

See also 

 List of judges of the Supreme Court of Ghana
 Supreme Court of Ghana

References 

Living people
Justices of the Supreme Court of Ghana
1955 births
Ghanaian women judges
20th-century judges
21st-century judges
People educated at Wesley Girls' Senior High School
20th-century Ghanaian lawyers
University of Ghana alumni
20th-century women judges
21st-century women judges